Louis Dubourg may refer to:

 Louis William Valentine DuBourg (1766–1833), American Sulpician bishop of the Roman Catholic Church
 Louis Fabricius Dubourg (1693–1775), Dutch painter and engraver